The Ambassador of Malaysia to Japan is the head of Malaysia's diplomatic mission to Japan. The position has the rank and status of an Ambassador Extraordinary and Plenipotentiary and is based in the Embassy of Malaysia, Tokyo.

List of heads of mission

Ambassadors to Japan

See also
Japan–Malaysia relations

References 

 
Japan
Malaysia